This is a list of Vincent Motorcycles.

See also

List of AMC motorcycles*
List of Ariel motorcycles
List of BSA motorcycles
List of Norton motorcycles
List of Triumph motorcycles
List of Royal Enfield motorcycles
List of Velocette motorcycles

Vincent
Vincent
List